Osinsky District is an administrative district (raion) of Perm Krai, Russia; one of the thirty-three in the krai. Municipally, it is incorporated as Osinsky Municipal District. It is located in the south of the krai and borders with Permsky District in the north, Kungursky District in the east, Bardymsky District in the south, Yelovsky District in the southwest, Chastinsky District in the west, and with Okhansky District in the northwest. Its administrative center is the town of Osa. Population:  The population of Osa accounts for 71.8% of the district's total population.

Geography
50.2% of district's territory is covered by forests. Climate is temperate continental. Main rivers include the Kama River and its tributary the Tulva.

History
The district was established on January 1, 1924. In October 1938, it became a part of Perm Oblast.

Demographics
Ethnic composition as of the 2002 Census:
Russians: 90.1%
Bashkirs and Tatars: 6%

Economy
District's economy is mostly based on agriculture, mining, and food industry.

References

Notes

Sources

Districts of Perm Krai
States and territories established in 1924